Why Bother? may refer to:

"Why Bother?" (essay), 1996 essay by American novelist Jonathan Franzen
"Why Bother?" (song), 1996 song from Weezer's album Pinkerton
Why Bother? (radio show), 1994 radio show album by Chris Morris and Peter Cook
Why Bother? (album), 2007 album from the Detroit band ADULT